The prime minister of St Lucia is the head of government of St Lucia. The prime minister heads the executive branch and chairs the cabinet. This article contains a list of prime ministers of Saint Lucia.

Constitutional basis
Section 60 of the constitution of Saint Lucia provides that the prime minister must be a member of the House of Assembly and that the governor-general shall "appoint a member of the House who appears to him likely to command the support of the majority of the members of the House", or if the House is dissolved, "a person who was a member of the House immediately before the dissolution". The same section requires the governor-general to remove the prime minister from office if a resolution of no confidence is passed and the prime minister does not resign within three days. The office of prime minister also becomes vacant if the holder ceases to be a member of the House of Assembly.

List of officeholders 

 Symbols

 
 †    Died in office

Chief ministers of Saint Lucia (1960–1967)

Premier of Saint Lucia (1967–1979)

Prime ministers of Saint Lucia (1979–present)

See also 
Governor-General of Saint Lucia

References

Saint Lucia, Prime Ministers
Politics of Saint Lucia
Government of Saint Lucia
 
Prime Minister
1979 establishments in Saint Lucia